The 2021 BOOST National was held November 2 to 7 at the Chestermere Recreation Centre in Chestermere, Alberta. It was the second Grand Slam and second major of the 2021–22 curling season.

Qualification
The top 16 ranked men's and women's teams on the World Curling Federation's world team rankings qualified for the event. In the event that a team declines their invitation, the next-ranked team on the world team ranking is invited until the field is complete.

Men
Top world team ranking men's teams:
 Brad Jacobs
 John Epping
 Bruce Mouat
 Mike McEwen
 Brendan Bottcher
 Brad Gushue
 Matt Dunstone
 Kevin Koe
 Yannick Schwaller
 Peter de Cruz
 Ross Whyte
 Ross Paterson
 Niklas Edin
 Jason Gunnlaugson
 Rich Ruohonen
 Braden Calvert
 Glenn Howard

Women
Top world team ranking women's teams:
 Anna Hasselborg
 Kerri Einarson
 Tracy Fleury
 Eve Muirhead
 Jennifer Jones
 Silvana Tirinzoni
 Rachel Homan
 Satsuki Fujisawa
 Kim Eun-jung
 Alina Kovaleva
 Laura Walker
 Kim Min-ji
 Kelsey Rocque
 Isabella Wranå
 Gim Un-chi
 Tabitha Peterson
 Irene Schori
 Hollie Duncan
 Corryn Brown

Men

Teams

The teams are listed as follows:

Knockout brackets

Source:

A event

B event

C event

Knockout results

All draw times are listed in Mountain Time (UTC−06:00).

Draw 1
Tuesday, November 2, 8:00 am

Draw 2
Tuesday, November 2, 11:30 am

Draw 3
Tuesday, November 2, 3:00 pm

Draw 5
Wednesday, November 3, 8:00 am

Draw 6
Wednesday, November 3, 12:00 pm

Draw 7
Wednesday, November 3, 4:00 pm

Draw 9
Thursday, November 4, 8:00 am

Draw 11
Thursday, November 4, 4:00 pm

Draw 13
Friday, November 5, 8:00 am

Draw 15
Friday, November 5, 4:00 pm

Draw 17
Saturday, November 6, 8:00 am

Playoffs

Quarterfinals
Saturday, November 6, 4:00 pm

Semifinals
Saturday, November 6, 8:00 pm

Final
Sunday, November 7, 10:00 am

Women

Teams

The teams are listed as follows:

Knockout brackets

Source:

A event

B event

C event

Knockout results

All draw times are listed in Mountain Time (UTC−06:00).

Draw 2
Tuesday, November 2, 11:30 am

Draw 3
Tuesday, November 2, 3:00 pm

Draw 4
Tuesday, November 2, 6:30 pm

Draw 5
Wednesday, November 3, 8:00 am

Draw 7
Wednesday, November 3, 4:00 pm

Draw 8
Wednesday, November 3, 8:00 pm

Draw 10
Thursday, November 4, 12:00 pm

Draw 12
Thursday, November 4, 8:00 pm

Draw 13
Friday, November 5, 8:00 am

Draw 14
Friday, November 5, 12:00 pm

Draw 16
Friday, November 5, 8:00 pm

Playoffs

Quarterfinals
Saturday, November 6, 12:00 pm

Semifinals
Saturday, November 6, 8:00 pm

Final
Sunday, November 7, 2:00 pm

Notes

References

External links

November 2021 sports events in Canada
2021 in Canadian curling
Curling in Alberta
2021 in Alberta
2021